Sexuality in music videos has been evident since the 1980s.

1980s
On August 1, 1981, MTV, the first 24-hour music video channel, began broadcasting. Directed towards adolescents, it promoted societal trends through video content and advertisements. The material displayed helped the audience identify appropriate male and female roles, behaviors, and careers. In the 1980s, typical feminine stereotypes included: submissive, performed household duties and emotional. In contrast common male clichés were: dominant, professional occupations and aggressive. Young adults watched MTV mainly because it was different from other programs; they were intrigued by the combination of visuals with music and watched them as "leisure time entertainment". The Rolling Stones, AC/DC, Michael Jackson, and Guns N' Roses were  significant musicians featured on MTV. Music Television had a commanding influence on its audience and heavily affected the ways adolescents viewed their role in society.

Music videos released in the 1980s typically depicted women as alluring objects. Aligning with typical stereotypes, women were portrayed as attractive, yet submissive. Although women's talents may be acknowledged, their skill never surpassed the male's; this concept is evident in AC/DC's video for "Sink the Pink". In the video one of the main characters is a self-assured woman who is a skilled pool player. She uses her talent and sexuality as an attention-getter but is not shown as more talented than the male characters.

In a 1987 study, thirty hours of MTV content was analyzed. The results suggested: 57% of music videos displayed women being objectified, 17% showed women's talents being accounted for yet her sexual role was highlighted, 14% did not align with typical stereotypes and 12% acknowledged women's independence. In addition to these results, touching was displayed in over 50% of music videos and women were often seen in seductive clothing.

1990s
Music remained an essential part of the cultural evolution of the 1990s. The music scene transitioned into a darker and more provocative sound with the rise of the genres of alternative, hip-hop and R&B. Popular music videos of the time came from artists such as Nirvana, Notorious B.I.G., Aaliyah, Weezer, Michael Jackson, and Radiohead. While the acclaimed artists and genres of the time differed from the previous decade, the visual depictions of this music and how they were delivered to the public remained the same. MTV continued to be socially relevant. Airing music videos continued youth culture's exposure to varied visual experiences. As music videos grew in popularity and cultural prominence, researchers began to look at the link between gender identities and mass media platforms. Several studies have been conducted regarding gender portrayals in music videos of the 1990s.

In early 1990, MTV created a program standards department which aimed to reject music videos featuring extremely graphic and explicit content. It sought to prohibit any signs of female nudity and violence directed toward female figures. For example, MTV rejected Madonna's "Justify my Love" video due to its explicit content. After this program was implemented, a study was conducted to analyze the centrality and depiction of women in the 100 most popular videos of the decade. This study first sorted men and women in the categories of either leading or supporting figures in the videos revealing men outnumbered women in lead roles by a five-to-one margin. Secondly, the study categorized the lead roles into seven main portrayals: artist, poser, comic, actress, superhuman, dancer, or crowd-pleaser. The analysis found that a majority of women in leadership roles were portrayed as either posers (35%) or dancers (29%), while men in lead roles were more equally disbursed among the seven categories. Portraying women predominately as dancers or posers implied that, in the 90s, women needed not display musical talent, but instead physical talent that emphasized a sexual attitude. Meanwhile, the equal disbursement of men among the categories suggested that men could better exhibit skills of musical and performing prowess.

Other studies analyzed 123 music videos from varying genres that aired in the summer of 1995. 44.7% of the videos failed to feature a female in a central role, while 31.7% of the videos portrayed women as conventional, meaning they served either as objects or sensory props to romantic male desire. However, the overtly sexual nature of women in these videos was not the only thing analyzed. Gender displays in the form of nonverbal sexual cues were also considered, proving women could also be depicted as more subliminally sexual than men. For example, in the videos only 1.24% of men touched their hair compared to 38.35% of females. Additionally, only 26.80% of males danced suggestively in their videos compared to 74% of females. The study examines the distinction between the prominence and depiction of male and female gender portrayals within the music videos of the 1990s.

2000s

Music remained integral to cultural life in the 2000s, even though not many new genres were created during this time other than a few indie-related and electronic genres. Teen Pop had a heavy influence over the 90s and into the first part of the decade. Artists like Britney Spears, Christina Aguilera, NSYNC and Backstreet Boys were extremely popular in the early 2000s. By the mid-2000s, Contemporary R&B had become the most popular genre with artists Like Usher at the forefront.

A 2008 study by Jacob Turner hypothesized that African American genres of music—hip-hop, rhythm and blues—would feature the most sexual content in their music videos while white genres—Country and Rock—would feature less. The study found that 73% of all music videos had some sort of sexual content. The study also found that 90.09% of mixed Hip-Hop and R&B music videos contained sexual content, followed by Hip-Hop with 79.7% and R&B with 76.9%. The genres that contained the least amount of sexual content on their music videos were Rock with 40% and Country with 37%. The study also looked into how African American and white wallpaper characters were dressed in music videos. It found African American wallpaper characters were three times more likely to dress provocatively than white wallpaper characters. The study also found that while African Americans were not underrepresented in music videos, it proposes this is because videos featuring African Americans contained significantly more sexual content than videos that featured whites.
In 2004, many family groups and politicians lobbied unsuccessfully to ban Eric Prydz's "Call on Me" video for containing women dancing in a sexually suggestive way.

In 2005, the music video of "These Boots Are Made for Walkin'", which featured Jessica Simpson in character as Daisy Duke, was controversial for featuring Simpson in "revealing" outfits and washing the General Lee car in her bikini. The controversy resulted in the music video being banned in some countries.

Sexuality in music videos can be perceived as something positive or negative, depending on the viewer. It has been growing and impacting the world. In 2008, sexual songs were on the top of the Billboard charts. Some sexual music videos have brought a varying degree of discomfort to people, leading to them being banned. For example, Madonna's music video for "What It Feels Like for a Girl" was banned due to sexualizing and portraying girls as violent and non-traditional.

Role of social media platforms
In the 2000s, social media platforms such as Facebook and MySpace grew in popularity, allowing users to share music videos quickly with one another. This had an impact on the direction of sexuality in music videos. Due to the increased accessibility of music videos online, many of which featured some sexually suggestive content, this led to the increased perception of normality with respect to sexual themes in music videos. 

In particular, YouTube was a major contributor to this trend. The platform, launched in early 2005, grew rapidly—with its videos amassing one billion daily videos by October 2009  and became the largest video sharing site on the internet. Although YouTube's success in the 2000s was relatively limited compared to its explosive growth in the 2010s, it was nevertheless one of the most popular sites on the internet. Naturally, it became a hub for music videos as many content creators and fans flocked to the site to post content. The easy accessibility of various music videos, some charged with sexual themes, began to increase the perception of its normality.

2010s

Into the 2010s, artists continued to garner headlines for provocative content in their music videos. For example, Rihanna's music video for the song "S&M", in which she simulates sex with a life-sized doll and wears bondage gear, generated much media attention and was banned in 11 countries. YouTube required its users to verify they were 18 years of age before being able to view the video. The video's director, Melina Matsoukas, responded to the controversy by saying she felt it was a success because the provocative imagery created a dialogue around the video. Conversely, Ariana Grande's "Everyday" video which depicts several couples beginning to have sex in various public places, such as on a bus, was praised for its sex positivity and inclusion of different races and sexual orientations.

Recent research has looked into the effects music videos that sexually objectify women have on women's body image perceptions. A study of college students found that young women with low self-esteem were more likely to view their body in a negative light after exposure to a sexually-objectifying music video. The same study found exposure to sexually objectifying music videos lessened the extremes of young women's concepts of an ideal body weight. A 2017 study found a relationship between sexual content in dance music videos and negative attitudes toward sex and sexuality among young adults in the United States and Australia.

Some scholars have noted that sexualized content in music videos rarely depicts non-heterosexuality. Frederik Dhaenens has pointed out that when music videos feature gay content, it often involves a "heteronormative shaping of gay and lesbian identities", citing Macklemore and Ryan Lewis' "Same Love" as an example. Carly Rae Jepsen's music video "Call Me Maybe" demonstrates the heteronormativity in music videos. Its scenes portray stereotypical heterosexual figures who reiterate heterosexuality. The music video focuses around heterosexuality by using homosexuality to bring attention to the video. Music videos like Disclosure's "Latch" and Citizens!' "True Romance" emphasize homosexuality on a small-scale. It is presented in small amounts to include sexual diversity and attraction. The artists' music videos depict heterosexuality but also include homosexuality to embrace social change.

Expansion of social media
YouTube continued to grow in the 2010s after a successful half-decade since its launch in the 2000s. Sexual themes were explored in videos that grew to enormous popularity on YouTube. Meghan Trainor's 2014 single "All About That Bass" is one example of this trend, although a milder one, as the sexual themes were very subtle. Nevertheless, the video amassed over 2.3 billion views on YouTube as of November 2019. Also in the 2010s came the rise of music streaming platforms such as Spotify, which reached 248 million active users by October 2019. The site is possibly creating a countermovement to the increased acceptance furthered by YouTube's growth by de-emphasizing the video itself in favor of the sound.

Depictions of race
Studies have shown music videos featuring African American characters tend to feature significantly more depictions of sexual acts than videos featuring white characters. For example, African American women are more likely to be depicted as engaging in sexual behaviors and wearing provocative clothing. A study in the American Journal of Health Education attributed music videos' "frank sexual messages, objectification, and overtly sexual images" to apathy toward these behaviors in African American girls. The journal considered this dangerous in light of the heightened HIV risk for African Americans. It has been suggested by scholar Jacob Turner that white-run corporations like Viacom (which owns MTV) are more willing to pay for music videos from African American artists who perpetuate racial and sexual stereotypes, thus explaining why African Americans videos are disproportionately sexualized compared to white videos. Implications include the idea that Black women may internalize video messages about beauty and sexuality, and that Black men and White individuals may form inaccurate and harmful ideas of Black femininity because of music video images. 2

Sexuality has been thoroughly addressed in terms of how it is used in music videos, however, race in relation to sexuality in music videos has not been covered effectively. Race and music have been intertwined for hundreds of years, with certain races relating to specific types of music more closely. For example, younger African Americans tend to listen to hip hop while older whites listen to county and classical music. While certain races can relate more to certain music genres, modern times have led to an increase in all races listening to all types of music.

Although there has been an increase in races listening to all types of music, the content in music videos has not changed much. Hip hop videos still tend to feature predominantly African Americans with their focus upon a generalized harsh lifestyle that only a portion of the African American population truly faces. In addition, country songs still tend to focus on a white male lead, while their audience has expanded to include many different races over time. Youth culture has driven the population to become more accepting towards all types of music genres and videos. This has allowed for the roles of certain races and genders within videos to change as well.

Modern technology, social media, and prominent figures in music are increasing the reach of music globally, including South Korea and India. Their growing influence in the music industry has allowed for many racial stereotypes, such as the Indian taxi driver, however, stereotypes within the US still dominate how people from across the world are portrayed in music videos. As an increasing number of American artists have begun to collaborate with foreign artists such as BTS, racial stereotyping is becoming less of a factor in how different races are portrayed in music videos.

Asian artists, like BoA, have been accused of presenting Western stereotypes of Asian female sexuality in their music videos in an attempt to gain popularity in the United States. Japan's Koda Kumi and AKB48 also present sexuality in their music videos. Male K-pop star Rain's music video for his song "Rainism" has been credited with helping to refute stereotypes of Asian men as effeminate and weak depicting an Asian man in various sexual situations, primarily with white women.

In the article "Sex and the Spectacles of Music Videos: An Examination of the Portrayal of Race and Sexuality in Music Videos", Jacob Turner studies the sexual behavior portrayed in music videos by two races. His study argued that African American women were more likely to portray sexual content than white women in music videos that were televised in the United States. This included both the use of provocative clothing and sexual acts in the videos, which ultimately showed how gender roles and race play a part in the amount of sexual content in music videos. In Erika VanDyke's article "Race, Body, and sexuality in music videos", she argues that men appear more often in music videos than women. Men are usually portrayed as "powerful" and "aggressive" characters. Consequently, women occupy female stereotypical roles in these music videos and are usually seen as passive and are objectified in this manner.

See also

 Censorship of music
 BDSM in culture and media
 Exploitation of women in mass media
 Misogyny in rap music
 Nudity in music videos
 Sexism in heavy metal music
 Sexual objectification
 Sexploitation film

References

Telecommunications-related introductions in 1981
Films about sexuality
Music videos
Sexuality in popular culture
Sexualization